The Astorian, formerly known as The Daily Astorian, is a newspaper, published in Astoria, Oregon, United States, established in 1873, and in publication continuously since then. The paper serves the Astoria, Warrenton, Seaside area, the Long Beach Peninsula, and surrounding areas. The newspaper is published three times each week and has a circulation of approximately 8,400. It is owned by EO Media Group (formerly known as the East Oregonian Publishing Company), of Pendleton, Oregon.

The paper began publication on July 1, 1873, as the Tri-Weekly Astorian.  The name was changed to The Daily Astorian on May 1, 1876, when publication became daily except Sundays.  The paper's name has been altered several times since, becoming The Daily Morning Astorian in 1883, the Morning Astorian in 1899, the Evening Astorian-Budget – after the Morning Astorian and the 1893-founded Astoria Evening Budget merged – in 1930, and The Daily Astorian in 1960. In 2019, it switched to publishing three times a week and is now known as 'The Astorian', dropping 'Daily' from its name.

Its original publisher, DeWitt Clinton Ireland, sold the paper in 1880, and the publication has seen several changes of ownership since. The East Oregonian Publishing Company became the newspaper's owner in 1973, when that company merged with the Astorian-Budget Publishing Company. That company changed its name to EO Media Group in January 2013.

A new printing press was brought into use in February 2010, replacing one that had lasted since 1970. The new press was secondhand, from the Chicago Sun-Times, but was only five years old when acquired by the Astorian.

In popular culture
In the 2005 film The Ring Two, The Daily Astorian was the workplace of fictional investigative journalist Rachel Keller. In the film, the newspaper headquarters is shown located at Astoria 12th and Marine Dr.

References

External links
History of The Daily Astorian at East Oregonian Publishing Co. website
May 1, 1876 issue of The Daily Astorian, archived at Chronicling America (Library of Congress)

Astoria, Oregon
1873 establishments in Oregon
Newspapers published in Oregon
Oregon Newspaper Publishers Association
Publications established in 1873